Eugene M. Davis (born January 27, 1952) is an American actor known for playing the psychotic killer Warren Stacy in the 1983 film 10 to Midnight with Charles Bronson; he also played a killer in another Bronson vehicle, 1988's Messenger of Death. Other credits include the psychological thriller Fear X (2003) and a role as a cross-dressing police informant in the Al Pacino movie Cruising (1980).

Personal life
He is the brother of actor Brad Davis and the son of Dr. Eugene Davis, DMD. He was raised in Titusville, Florida, attended and graduated from Titusville High School.

Filmography

External links

Living people
American male film actors
American male television actors
Titusville High School alumni
1952 births